This article provides a list of the 1787 episodes and 30 specials of the version of the Japanese anime Doraemon that began airing in 1979 and stopped in 2005, when it was succeeded by the 2005 series.

1979

1980

1981

1982

1983

1984

1985

1986

1987

1988

1989

1990

1991

1992

1993

1994

1995

1996

1997

1998

1999

2000

2001

2002

2003

2004

2005

Doraemon (anime)
Doraemon lists
Doraemon